Annemijn Thomson (born 26 January 1996) is a Dutch cricketer. She played for the Netherlands women's national cricket team in the 2015 ICC Women's World Twenty20 Qualifier in December 2015.

In June 2018, she was named in the Netherlands' squad for the 2018 ICC Women's World Twenty20 Qualifier tournament. In August 2019, she was named in the Dutch Women's Twenty20 International (WT20I) squad for the 2019 Netherlands Women's Quadrangular Series. She made her WT20I debut for the Netherlands, against Ireland, on 8 August 2019.

References

External links
 

1996 births
Living people
Dutch women cricketers
Netherlands women Twenty20 International cricketers
Place of birth missing (living people)